The Hon. John Rigg MLC CMG (1 November 1858 – 20 October 1943) was a New Zealand politician of the Labour Party.

Biography
Rigg was born in St Kilda, Victoria, Australia in 1858 and was a typographer and union secretary. His family came to New Zealand in 1863 or 1864 and initially settled in Dunedin, before moving to Wellington where Rigg received his education. He was the first President of the Independent Political Labour League in 1905. Following his father's job loss, Rigg had to leave school aged twelve years to support the family financially.

John Rigg experienced poverty and unemployment and this caused 'his private revolution'. He describes this and refers to his Scottish noble heritage: 'found in me the makings of a snob and left me a Socialist.'.

John Rigg became active in leading apprentice printers rights and women's rights and later expressed this through his 1892 roles of president of the Wellington Tailoresses' Union, Trades and Labour Council, and Typographical Society.

He was first appointed to the Legislative Council as a Labour representative on 15 October 1892, as one of four moderate union leaders appointed.  He resigned on 27 May 1893. He was appointed again a fortnight later on 6 June 1893. At the end of the seven-year terms, he was reappointed on 6 June 1900 and 1 July 1907. Rigg was elected Chairman of Committees on 8 July 1903 and held that title until 6 July 1904. He was Acting Speaker from 5 January to 7 July 1904. Because he refused to condemn the 1913 waterfront strike in Wellington, the Reform Government did not reappoint him to the Legislative Council in 1914.

Another highlight in his life was being among the escorts with King George VI in 1903 to the Pacific Islands.

He moved to Christchurch around 1920 and his political activity stopped. In 1937, the First Labour Government acknowledged Rigg's contribution to the formation of the party by awarding him a CMG. He died in Christchurch on 20 October 1943 and was buried two days later at Bromley Cemetery. He was survived by his second wife Louise Rigg, who died in 1955.

Notes

References

External links
Biography in 1966 Encyclopaedia of New Zealand

|-

|-

1858 births
1943 deaths
Australian emigrants to New Zealand
Speakers of the New Zealand Legislative Council
New Zealand left-wing activists
New Zealand trade unionists
Independent Political Labour League MLCs
Social Democratic Party (New Zealand) MLCs
Members of the New Zealand Legislative Council
Burials at Bromley Cemetery
Politicians from Wellington City
Politicians from Melbourne